Earplay was the longest-running of the formal series of radio drama anthologies on National Public Radio, produced by WHA in Madison, Wisconsin and heard from 1972 into the 1990s. It approached radio drama as an art form with scripts written by such leading playwrights as Edward Albee, Arthur Kopit, Archibald MacLeish and David Mamet.

Airing in stereo, Earplay provided a showcase for original and adapted work. Eventually, the less-sustained successor series NPR Playhouse drew episodes from the Earplay run. Often presented by NPR member stations on a weekly basis, Earplay episodes were produced with much attention to recording technique and sound-effects.

In 1975, it scored a triumph with Listening, an original play written by Edward Albee for stereo radio, employing one speaker for one character and another speaker for another character. Since both characters are seated in a room, the illusion is created that they are in the same room as the listener. After its premiere on radio, Listening was later performed on stage.

Along with the CBS Radio Mystery Theater, Sears Radio Theater, The General Mills Radio Adventure Theater, Christian radio's Unshackled and Public Radio's The National Radio Theater of Chicago, Earplay was among the most ambitious nationwide projects in the medium in the U.S. during the 1970s and 1980s.

Beginnings 
With a grant from the National Endowment of the Arts, Earplay began in 1972 directed by Karl Schmidt, legendary producer and radio executive at WHA Madison, Wisconsin. Karl was determined to bring a new and invigorating approach to radio drama. He faced major obstacles from other public radio broadcasters and had to prove the new approach would gain listeners. He enlisted the help of Tom Voegeli, a newcomer to the field of audio, but as the son of Don Voegeli (composer of NPR's All Things Considered theme music), he had the innate knowledge and enthusiasm that Karl wanted. (Tom has had a distinguished career in public broadcasting spanning 40 years since). Another contributor was Martha Van Cleef fresh from her PhD at the UW and eager to enlist writers into this forgotten medium.

It was she who convinced both Edward Albee and Archibald MacLeish to write original dramas for Earplay. It was this that brought the program to the attention of BBC producers. Karl enlisted the aid of John Tydemann an experienced BBC producer to oversee Albee’s play, Listening. The three on them spent three days in a studio working with such stars as Irene Worth. MacLeish’s play JB was adapted by Earplay.

New radio drama 
As a  result, in 1975 Earplay sent its new executive producer, Howard Gelman to the BBC for secondment. He worked in the script department alongside another newcomer to audio, John Madden and under the direction of Martin Esslin, BBC head of drama, and Richard Imison, BBC head of scripts. John and Howard returned to Earplay in 1976 to bring a new approach to radio drama, one that did not rely on real time production, that is, recording dramas in real time with sound effects and music. Their idea was to produce radio as if it were film, that is, in segments in several takes without additions such as effects and music. This meant that they could be totally portable and fast, They could record voices in a day in a Los Angeles studio or a New York studio, wherever the best talent could be convinced to work on new and vibrant dramas written and acted by the best new talent anywhere in the country. Then they took the raw tapes back to Madison for post production. Given the technology at the time, they worked with multi tracking 2-inch tapes on a 24-track control board. They transferred the finished dramas onto long playing records and later switched to cassette tapes for distribution to the public broadcasting network throughout the country. Now Earplay was a full NPR distributed national program.

Production technique 
Earplay was receiving over 25 scripts a week and  Howard Gelman and his colleague, David Patt, were working with writers and theatre and film directors to record a series of 30 and 60 minute drama in one or two days in one location and then adding sound effects and music at its base studio. The result was a different sound, one that did not mimic the theatre or film but provided an immediacy that produced a more intimate listening experience. This approach gave Earplay its most successful production—Wings. Written by Arthur Kopit and using the ground breaking studio work of John Madden and effects from Tom Voegeli, the play explored the brain of a woman going through a stroke and recuperation. Wings won the coveted European Prix Italia prize as the best radio drama of 1977. It was also the first Earplay to be staged in the theatre after its radio launch. Other plays that went to different media were Listening by Edward Albee, The Water Engine by David Mamet and Ladyhouse Blues by Kevin McCarthy. A brief list of playwrights who worked with Earplay include, David Mamet, Israel Horowitz, Mark Medof and Archibald MacLeish.

Programming dilemma 
Now Earplay had to convince broadcasters that it could produce enough dramas to satisfy a programmer’s requirements. It produced a package of one-hour dramas introduced by well-known WFMT radio voice, Cary Frumkin. Earplay had been distributing its shorter dramas since 1973; however, from 1976 until 1980, it produced its signature dramas of 26-hour long programs each year. That’s over 100 original radio dramas. At the same time, NPR with John Madden and Tom Voegeli took over the audio version of Star Wars producing it at Sound 80 studios in Minneapolis using the same recording techniques as Earplay.

The basic question Earplay faced was whether it could survive on station participation only and the answer was ‘no’. They tried to recycle their productions, cutting them into 15-minute episodes and reusing older recorded programs. Earplay was always expensive by public broadcasting prices. At this time a successful commercial radio drama series was running as the CBS Mystery Theatre. It was backed by Hyman Brown a very successful producer and director. Another commercial program at the time (though not as successful) was Elliot Lewis’ Sears Radio Theatre.

Final act 
By 1982 when it lost its Arts funding, Earplay abruptly went off the air. Its style of production was picked up by several BBC producers and even taken in by ABC producers in Australia. Radio drama in public radio in the US reverted to more local talent or community groups such as ZBS. Karl Schmidt, Tom Voegeli, John Madden and Howard Gelman went on to successful endeavors in radio, film and publishing. For a brief time, Earplay presented a unique creative outlet for audio drama.

Listen 
22 episodes Internet archive Retrieved 2011 September 15

References

External links 
 Interview with Tom Lopez

American radio dramas
1970s American radio programs
1980s American radio programs
1990s American radio programs
NPR programs
1972 radio programme debuts
Peabody Award-winning radio programs
Anthology radio series